The Niesen Funicular is a funicular railway above Lake Thun in the canton of Bern, Switzerland. It links a lower terminus, in the village of Mülenen at 693 m and adjacent to Mülenen station on the Lötschberg railway line, with an upper terminus at 2336 m near the summit of Niesen, a viewpoint above the lake and Bernese Oberland. The funicular has two sections with a total length of 3.5 km, a difference of elevation of 1643 m and a maximum incline of 68%.

Construction of the line commenced in 1906, and it opened in 1910.

The stairs are usually employee-only, but there is a public run called "Niesenlauf" once a year.

The line is owned and operated by the Niesenbahn AG.

Operation 
The line operates from late April to mid November, with cars operating every 30 minutes between 08:00 and 17:00. A 15-minute interval service is provided at busy periods, and evening services are operated on some days.

The line comprises two sections, with an interchange station at Schwandegg, and has the following parameters:

Further reading

References

External links 

Official website of the Niesenbahn funicular

Funicular railways in Switzerland
Metre gauge railways in Switzerland
Transport in the canton of Bern
1910 establishments in Switzerland